Shaka Bangura (born February 9, 1986 in Kissy) is a Sierra Leonean footballer.

Career

Youth and College
Bangura moved to the United States from Sierra Leone when he was a small child, settling in College Park, Georgia. He attended North Clayton High School, where he scored a total of 58 goals and was named to the All Region Team every year. He then earned a sports scholarship to attend Montreat College in North Carolina. At Montreat he consistently made All Conference first team in the Appalachian Athletic Conference (AAC). His first year at Montreat he was named freshman of the year and was  also named the conference player of the year in his sophomore and junior year and during his senior year he won the golden boot award  He finished his college career having scored a total of 58 goals in four years.

During his college years Bangura also played with Atlanta FC in the National Premier Soccer League in 2008, and with Fredericksburg Gunners in the USL Premier Development League in 2009.

Professional
During the 2010 pre-season Bangura joined the Puerto Rico Islanders of the USSF D2 Pro League. He made his professional debut on April 21, 2010, in a game against NSC Minnesota Stars.

Bangura signed with Richmond Kickers of the USL Pro league on March 15, 2011, and scored the winning goal on his Kickers debut, a 2-1 win over Charleston Battery on April 23. After the 2011 season, Bangura signed with Anagennisi Dherynia in the Cypriot First Division.
In 2013 Bangura signed with Samut Songkhram in the Thai Premier League, where he helped the team survive relegation. One of his brightest moments came against Chainat, whom he single-handedly defeated. Later the week he made the Thai premier League all team. In 2014 Bangura was invited for a tryout with  Persija Jakarta. Bangura impressed with two goals in two games but was not awarded a contract. After the two games many teams in the Indonesia Super League were interested. Bangura decided to sign with Barito Putera, where he played 6 games with 4 goals and 2 assists in the Inter Island Cup.

Honours

Puerto Rico Islanders
CFU Club Championship Winner (1): 2010
'''USSF Division 2 Pro League Champion (1) 2010

Personal life
He is the cousin of Abdul Bangura, his teammate at Atlanta Silverbacks.

References

1986 births
Living people
Sierra Leonean footballers
Sierra Leonean emigrants to the United States
Sierra Leonean expatriate footballers
Puerto Rico Islanders players
Richmond Kickers players
Anagennisi Deryneia FC players
Sierra Leonean expatriate sportspeople in the United States
Expatriate footballers in Puerto Rico
Expatriate footballers in Cyprus
Expatriate footballers in Thailand
Expatriate soccer players in the United States
Fredericksburg Gunners players
USSF Division 2 Professional League players
USL League Two players
USL Championship players
Shaka Bangura
PS Barito Putera players
Atlanta Silverbacks players
North American Soccer League players
Cypriot First Division players
Association football forwards
Sportspeople from Freetown
National Premier Soccer League players
Montreat Cavaliers men's soccer players